Kumul is the Uyghur name of Hami, a city in Xinjiang, China. 

Kumul may also refer to:

 Kumul Khanate, a semi-autonomous vassal state within the Qing Empire and the Republic of China
 Kumul (bird), Paradisaea raggiana, the national bird of Papua New Guinea
 Morobe United F.C., called "the Blue Kumuls" or "Morobe Kumuls", a Papua New Guinea association football club
 The Kumuls, nickname for the Papua New Guinea national rugby league team